Tatjana "Tanja" Savić (born 20 March 1985) is a Serbian singer who rose to prominence in the first season of Zvezde Granda (2004).

Career
In 2004, Savić auditioned for the first season of the singing competition show Zvezde Granda, where she ultimately placed as the second runner-up. Subsequently, she was signed to Grand Production, under which she released her debut album Tako mlada in 2005. The album, which was sold in 100,000 copies, spawned popular songs like "Tako mlada", "Minut ljubavi" and "Zašto me u obraz ljubiš".

It was followed by studio albums Tanja Savić (2008) and Sestre po suzama (2009), which included hit songs "Zlatnik", "Gde ljubav putuje" and "Sestre po suzama". Additionally, her songs "Suknjica" and "Gde ljubav putuje" were featured in the movies Guča! (2006) and Srpski ožiljci (2009), respectively.

In 2014, Savić participated in the second season of the competition show Tvoje lice zvuči poznato, winning in the ninth episode as Rhianna. 

After facing career setbacks due to living in Australia, Savić managed to retrieve her popularity by collaborating with rappers Corona and Rimski on the single "Oči boje viskija", released in November 2017. She continued working with the duo on her commercially successful extended play Stranci, which was released in December 2019 through IDJTunes.

Personal life
Savić was born on 20 March 1985 in the village of Radinac near Smederevo, SR Serbia, SFR Yugoslavia.

In 2011, she married Serbian-Australian businessman from Queensland, Dušan Jovaničević, with whom she has two sons. The couple separated in 2020, followed by a highly publicized custody battle, in which Savić accused her then-husband of relocating their children to Australia against her will. In March 2021, she was eventually reunited with her sons after close to a year of separation.

Discography
Studio albums, EPs
Tako mlada (2005)
Tanja Savić (2008)
Sestre po suzama (2009)
Stranci (2019)

Filmography

See also
 Music of Serbia
 List of singers from Serbia
 Turbo-folk

References

External links
 
 

1985 births
Living people
Musicians from Smederevo
Serbian folk-pop singers
21st-century Serbian women singers
Serbian people of Romani descent
Grand Production artists
Beovizija contestants